Riwandi Wahit (born 6 March 1981) is a Bruneian footballer who last played as a striker for Najip FC of the Brunei Super League. He previously played for QAF FC for more than a decade.

Riwandi began his career with the Bruneian representative team playing in the Malaysian league system, starting in 1999 with the team that won the Malaysia Cup that year. He moved to Brunei's domestic league with newly formed QAF FC in 2003, entering the B-League in its second season. Appointed as captain in 2006, his last season with the club came in 2014, from whereafter the club decided not to remain playing in the Brunei Super League. By that time, he had won the league three times and the Brunei League Cup twice.

International career
Riwandi made his international debut for Brunei on 6 August 1999, coming on as a substitute in a 0–2 loss to Malaysia in the third group game at the 1999 SEA Games held in his home country. He made a total of 13 appearances for the Wasps, captaining Brunei for the three occasions that his club side QAF FC was representing the national team.

International goals

Honours

Team
Brunei M-League Team
 Malaysia Cup: 1999

QAF FC
 Brunei Premier League (3): 2005–06, 2007–08, 2009–10
 Brunei League Cup (2): 2008, 2009

Individual
  Meritorius Service Medal (PJK) (1999)

External links

References

1981 births
Living people
Association football forwards
Bruneian footballers
Brunei international footballers
Brunei (Malaysia Premier League team) players
Competitors at the 1999 Southeast Asian Games
Southeast Asian Games competitors for Brunei